In Alberta, Canada, the 1961 municipal election was held October 18, 1961 to elect a mayor and five aldermen to sit on Edmonton City Council and four trustees to sit on each of the public and separate school boards.  The electorate also decided six plebiscite questions.

There were ten aldermen on city council, but five of the positions were already filled: Frederick John Mitchell, George Prudham, Morris Weinlos, Ethel Wilson, and Milton Lazerte were all elected to two-year terms in 1960 and were still in office.

There were seven trustees on the public school board, but three of the positions were already filled: Warren Edward (Ted) Smith, John Andrews, and Shirley Forbes were elected to two-year terms in 1960 and were still in office.  The same was true on the separate board, where Leo Lemieux, Edward Stack, and John Barbeau were continuing.

Voter turnout

There were 59343 ballots cast out of 169940 eligible voters, for a voter turnout of 37.2%.

Results

(bold indicates elected, italics indicate incumbent)

Mayor

Aldermen

Public school trustees

Separate (Catholic) school trustees

Plebiscites

Fluoridation of Water

Shall fluorides, for the prevention of tooth decay, be added to the City water supply sufficient to bring the fluorine content of City water up to a level of one part fluorine to one million parts of water?
Yes - 35508
No - 22107

Paving

Shall Council pass bylaw No. 2216 creating a debenture debt in the sum of $500,000.00 for the estimated City share of standard paving of main arterial roads in the City?
Yes - 25317
No - 9476

Asphalt on Gravel Streets

Shall Council pass bylaw No. 2217 creating a debenture debt in the sum of $500,000.00 for the estimated City share of the cost of constructing asphalt surface roads on a gravel base on residential and arterial streets within the City?
Yes - 25219
No - 9130

Traffic Lights and Fire Alarm Equipment

Shall Council pass bylaw No. 2218 creating a debenture debt in the sum of $217,000.00 in order to purchase and locate additional traffic lights, and school and crosswalk lights, and additional fire alarm equipment?
Yes - 26752
No - 7988

Library

Shall Council pass bylaw No. 2219 creating a debenture debt in the sum of $125,000.00 to construct and equip a branch library in Edmonton capable of serving 30,000 people and 15 schools?
Yes - 21434
No - 12983

Fire Station

Shall Council pass bylaw No. 2224 creating a debenture debt in the sum of $72,000.00 in order to purchase fire equipment for a District Fire Station?
Yes - 23761
No - 9947

References

City of Edmonton: Edmonton Elections

1961
1961 elections in Canada
1961 in Alberta
October 1961 events in Canada